All England may refer to:

A now defunct term for the Kingdom of England
All England Open Badminton Championships, one of the world's oldest badminton tournaments, started in the 1890s
All-England Championship, a wrestling title
All England Cup, a greyhound racing competition held at Brough Park
All-England Eleven, a term used for various non-international English cricket teams
All England Jumping Course at Hickstead, an equestrian sport (especially showjumping) venue
All England Law Reports, a long-running series of law reports covering cases from the court system in England and Wales
All England Lawn Tennis and Croquet Club, best known for the Wimbledon tennis championship
All-England Theatre Festival, a country-wide English theatre festival
All England Women's Lacrosse Association, one of the (now-merged) governing bodies for lacrosse in England